Kuttiyil Mathew Joseph (born 17 June 1958) is a judge of Supreme Court of India. He is former chief justice of Uttarakhand High Court. Before his appointment as chief justice of the High Court of Uttarakhand on 31 July 2014, he had served as a judge of Kerala High Court for more than 9 years.

Early life and education
Joseph was born in Kottayam, Kerala, India on 17 June 1958 to Justice K. K. Mathew and Ammini Tharakan. His father K. K. Mathew was a judge of the Supreme Court of India, and chairman of tenth Law Commission. He completed his secondary education from Kendriya Vidyalaya, Kochi and New Delhi. Later he joined Loyola College, Chennai, and Government Law College, Ernakulam for graduation and further studies.

Career

As lawyer
He enrolled as an Advocate on 12 January 1982 and started practicing in Delhi High Court. Later he shifted his practice to High Court of Kerala, Ernakulam in 1983. Thereafter, In 1986 he started independent practice and specialised in civil, constitutional and writ matters. He served as amicus curiae for a case that decided whether a Christian father under an obligation to maintain his minor child just before being elevated to the High Court Bench.

As judge
He was appointed the permanent judge of Kerala High Court on 14 October 2004. On 18 July 2014, the President of India had appointed Joseph as the next chief justice of Uttarakhand, on recommendation of then CJI Rajendra Mal Lodha. On 31 July 2014, he was sworn in as the 9th Chief Justice of Uttarakhand High Court at Nainital.

A bench headed by Justice Joseph had quashed the imposition of President's Rule in 2016 by the Narendra Modi led BJP government in the state of Uttarakhand. While being a judge at the Kerala HC, a Bench comprising Justice Joseph ordered demolition of Kapico resorts constructed illegally on Nediathuruthu Island in Alappuzha district.

During February 2017, Judge Jasti Chelameswar, a judge of the Supreme Court of India Collegium, has recorded a strongly worded dissent note for not elevating Justice K.M. Joseph to the Supreme Court of India. "Justice Joseph is an outstanding judge with impeccable integrity and the most suitable judge for elevation to the Supreme Court", Chelameswar wrote. "By not elevating a highly competent judge like Justice Joseph, the collegium was setting an unhealthy precedent", he added in the note.

Controversy on elevation to Supreme Court 
According to media reports on 11 January 2018, the Supreme Court collegium has recommended the name of Justice Joseph for their appointment as judge of the Supreme Court. While recommending Justice Joseph's name for elevation to the Supreme Court, the 5 member collegium unanimously said that "The Collegium considered that at the time of recommendation, Mr. Justice K.M. Joseph, who hails from Kerala High Court and was functioning as Chief Justice of Uttarakhand High Court, is more deserving and suitable in all respects than other Chief Justices and senior puisne Judges of High Courts for being appointed as Judges of the Supreme Court of India". Despite the strongly worded recommendation of the collegium, there still exists some suspense on its acceptance by the NDA government. There were media reports speculating that the government had returned the collegium recommendation to elevate Justice Joseph to Supreme Court bench, which was later dismissed by unidentified sources from law ministry.

On 26 April 2018, the government, in a letter to the Chief Justice of India, said the proposed appointment of Justice KM Joseph as a judge of the Supreme Court at this stage does not appear to be appropriate. In the letter, Law Minister Ravi Shankar Prasad has said Justice KM Joseph is placed at number 42 in the All India High Court Judges’ Seniority list and there are presently 11 Chief Justices of various High Courts who are senior to him. If his name is returned, the Collegium can reiterate his name which will make it incumbent upon the government to issue a warrant for his appointment to the Supreme Court.

On the same day of government's refusal to appoint Justice Joseph as the Supreme Court Judge, the Supreme Court Bar Association moved a petition signed by 100 lawyers seeking a stay on the warrant appointing Indu Malhotra as a Supreme Court judge was mentioned by senior lawyer Indira Jaising before the Chief Justice. She mentioned that the petition is not against Smt. Indu Malhotra, but is against the government not clearing the name of Justice Joseph for segregating the collegium's recommendation. CJI Dipak Misra sternly rebuked lawyers and told Adv Indira Jaising, who mentioned it, that their prayer was unimaginable, unthinkable, inconceivable and never heard of. The government's extraordinary step provoked outrage among opposition parties and questions from the legal fraternity, but the Chief Justice, said: "If centre has segregated the recommendation and sent one of the names for reconsideration then they are within their rights."

Reiteration of collegium recommendation 
On 16 July 2018, Supreme Court Collegium headed by CJI Dipak Misra reiterated the name of Justice K M Joseph for elevation to the Apex Court. The resolution by the collegium read that after careful consideration, the collegium did not find any thing adverse regarding suitability of Joseph J. in the letters from the Law Minister. In a separate resolution, the Supreme Court Collegium recommended the names of Justice Indira Banerjee & Justice Vineet Saran, the CJs of Madras & Odisha High Courts, respectively.

References

20th-century Indian judges
1958 births
Living people
20th-century Indian lawyers
21st-century Indian judges
21st-century Indian lawyers
Indian Christians
Judges of the Kerala High Court
Justices of the Supreme Court of India
Justices of the Uttarakhand High Court
Kendriya Vidyalaya alumni
Saint Thomas Christians
Scholars from Kochi